RBC exchange may refer to:
The Royal Bank of Canada currency exchange
Erythrocytapheresis, red blood cell exchange